Bihpuria (IPA: ˈbɪəˌpʊərɪə) is a small  town in Lakhimpur district  in the state of Assam, India.

Demographics
 India census, Bihpuria had a population of 10,867. Males constitute 53% of the population and females 47%. Bihpuria has an average literacy rate of 77%, higher than the national average of 59.5%; with male literacy of 82% and female literacy of 73%. 11% of the population is under 6 years of age.

Politics
Bihpuria is part of Tezpur (Lok Sabha constituency). Dr. Amiya Kumar Bhuyan is the current MLA of the Bihpuria Constituency.

See also
Japjup

References

Cities and towns in Lakhimpur district
North Lakhimpur